Jérôme Bernard (born 1971) is a retired French racing cyclist. He rode two Tours of France in his career finishing 106th in 2001 and 102nd in 2002.

Major results
Source:
1995
 3rd Overall Trois Jours de Cherbourg
1998
 1st Bol d'Air Creusois
1997
 1st Boucles Catalanes
2001
 1st Stage 1 Grand Prix du Midi Libre
2003
 6th Overall Mi-Août en Bretagne
 9th Overall Étoile de Bessèges
2008
 9th Overall Tour de la Pharmacie Centrale

Grand Tour general classification results timeline

References

External links
 

1971 births
Living people
French male cyclists